Pellornis is an extinct genus of gruiform bird from the Early Eocene of Denmark.

References

Eocene life
Messelornithidae
Prehistoric birds of Europe
Prehistoric bird genera